Ips confusus, known generally as the pinyon pine beetle or pinyon ips, is a species of typical bark beetle in the family Curculionidae. It is found in Central America and North America.

References

Further reading

External links

 

Scolytinae
Articles created by Qbugbot
Beetles described in 1992